Pluto is a cartoon character created by The Walt Disney Company. He is a yellow-orange color, medium-sized, short-haired dog with black ears. Unlike most Disney characters, Pluto is not anthropomorphic beyond some characteristics such as facial expression. He is Mickey's pet. Officially a mixed-breed dog, he made his debut as a bloodhound in the Mickey Mouse cartoon The Chain Gang. Together with Mickey Mouse, Minnie Mouse, Donald Duck, Daisy Duck, and Goofy, Pluto is one of the "Sensational Six"—the biggest stars in the Disney universe. Though all six are non-human animals, Pluto alone is not dressed as a human.

Pluto debuted in animated cartoons and appeared in 24 Mickey Mouse films before receiving his own series in 1937. All together Pluto appeared in 89 short films between 1930 and 1953. Several of these were nominated for an Academy Award, including The Pointer (1939), Squatter's Rights (1946), Pluto's Blue Note (1947), and Mickey and the Seal (1948). One of his films, Lend a Paw (1941), won the award in 1942. Because Pluto does not speak, his films generally rely on physical humor. This made Pluto a pioneering figure in character animation, by expressing personality through animation rather than dialogue.

Like all of Pluto's co-stars, the dog has appeared extensively in comics over the years, first making an appearance in 1931. He returned to theatrical animation in 1990 with The Prince and the Pauper and has also appeared in several direct-to-video films. Pluto also appears in the television series Mickey Mouse Works (1999–2000), House of Mouse (2001–2003), Mickey Mouse Clubhouse (2006–2016), and the new Mickey Mouse shorts (2013–2019) along with its successor, The Wonderful World of Mickey Mouse (2020–present).

In 1998, Disney's copyright on Pluto, set to expire in 2003, was extended by the passage of the Sonny Bono Copyright Term Extension Act. Disney, along with other studios, lobbied for passage of the act to preserve their copyrights on characters such as Pluto for 20 additional years.

Origin
Pluto first appeared as a nameless bloodhound tracking the escaped convict Mickey in the film The Chain Gang, which released on August 6, 1930. On October 23 of that same year, The Picnic was released. Pluto was Minnie's dog and was named Rover. The Moose Hunt, which came out on May 3, 1931, Pluto appeared as Mickey's pet, and was given the name "Pluto".

Several months had passed between the naming of what was then classified as the ninth planet, Pluto, on May 1, 1930, and the attachment of that name to the dog character.  Disney animator Ben Sharpsteen said "We thought the name [Rover] was too common, so we had to look for something else. ... We changed it to Pluto the Pup ... but I don't honestly remember why." Some Disney animators reportedly believed that Walt Disney chose the name to capitalize on the sensation of the newly named planet. 

Pluto was initially a minor character until 1934 when Disney animator Norm Ferguson gave the dog a key role in the cartoon Playful Pluto. Pluto becomes entangled with a sticky piece of flypaper, and Ferguson expanded the sequence significantly. The segment became a classic, demonstrating how Disney artists can take a simple circumstance and build humor through a character.

Characterization
Unlike Mickey's other animal friends, such as Goofy (who is also a dog), Pluto is a relatively normal animal, with few anthropomorphic traits apart from his facial expressions. Pluto usually does not speak in English, walk upright, or wear clothing. A significant departure from this was his speaking role in The Moose Hunt (1931), which was produced before Pluto's characterization had been clearly defined. As Pluto made more appearances, it became common that he would mostly speak in barks and grunts like most dogs. Other ways of communicating Pluto's thoughts occur through his facial expressions, and sometimes through the use of a shoulder angel/devil who speak directly to Pluto. (Mickey's Elephant, Lend a Paw).

Pluto is generally a cheerful and adventurous dog, although he can be given to sheer panic when confronted with something unknown. Common themes in Pluto's stories involve him becoming jealous of Mickey getting another pet (Mickey's Elephant, Lend a Paw, Mickey and the Seal), Pluto accidentally and unwittingly swallowing something and panicking when he realizes it (Playful Pluto, Donald and Pluto), Pluto getting entangled with something inanimate like a piece of flypaper (Beach Picnic, Playful Pluto), or Pluto being pestered by a smaller animal (Private Pluto, Squatter's Rights). In many of his appearances with Mickey, Pluto will get himself into trouble and cause Mickey to get angry at him. Mickey, however, often cheers up quickly; often telling Pluto "Aw, I can't be mad at ya."

Pluto sometimes appears with other regular animal characters. His friends include Fifi the Peke, Dinah the Dachshund, and Ronnie the St. Bernard Puppy. Other animals he is less friendly with include Salty the Seal, Butch the Bulldog, Figaro the Kitten, Chip 'n Dale, Peg Leg Pete, Spike the Bee, Bent-Tail the Coyote, Milton the cat and other characters. In Disney's 1937 animated short Pluto's Quin-Puplets, Pluto has a son who is simply referred to as "Pluto Junior." In the 1946 animated short Pluto's Kid Brother, Pluto has a younger brother named K.B.

Appearances

Pluto first and most often appears in the Mickey Mouse series of cartoons. On rare occasions, he is paired with Donald Duck ("Donald and Pluto", "Beach Picnic", "Window Cleaners", "The Eyes Have It", "Donald's Dog Laundry", & "Put Put Troubles").

The first cartoons to feature Pluto as a solo star were two Silly Symphony shorts, Just Dogs (1932) and Mother Pluto (1936). In 1937, Pluto appeared in Pluto's Quin-Puplets which was the first installment of his own film series, then headlined Pluto the Pup. However, they were not produced on a regular basis until 1940, by which time the name of the series was shortened to Pluto.

His first comics appearance was in the Mickey Mouse comic strip in July 1931, two months after the release of The Moose Hunt. In 1938, Pluto headlined in the Silly Symphony Sunday comic strip, in an adaptation of his Silly Symphony short, Mother Pluto. Pluto was later featured in several sequences of the Silly Symphony strip in 1939 and 1940.

Pluto Saves the Ship, a comic book published in 1942, was one of the first Disney comics prepared for publication outside newspaper strips. However, not counting a few cereal giveaway mini-comics in 1947 and 1951, he did not have his own comics title until 1952.

In 1936, Pluto was featured in the picture book Mickey Mouse and Pluto the Pup by Whitman Publishing.

Pluto ran his own neighborhood in Disney's Toontown Online until its closedown. It was called the Brrrgh and it was always snowing there except during Halloween. During April Toons Week, a weekly event that was very silly, Pluto switched playgrounds with Minnie (all other characters did this as well), and he actually talked in Minnie's Melodyland.

Pluto has also appeared in the television series Mickey Mouse Works (1999–2000), Disney's House of Mouse (2001–2003), Mickey Mouse Clubhouse (2006–2016),  the new Mickey Mouse shorts (2013–2019), Mickey & the Roadster Racers (2017–present), The Wonderful World of Mickey Mouse (2020-present) and Mickey Mouse Funhouse (2021-present). Curiously enough, however, Pluto was the only standard Disney character not included when the whole gang was reunited for the 1983 featurette Mickey's Christmas Carol, although he did return in The Prince and the Pauper (1990) and Runaway Brain (1995). He also had a cameo at the ending of Who Framed Roger Rabbit (1988). In 1996, he made a cameo in the Quack Pack episode "The Really Mighty Ducks".

Short films
The following is a list of short films starring Pluto in the Pluto the Pup and Pluto series. It is not a complete filmography for Pluto as he has also appeared extensively in Mickey Mouse or Donald Duck films. Although some of such cartoons are labeled as Mickey cartoons, they are actually officially placed under Pluto's filmography.

 The Chain Gang (1930)
 The Picnic (1930)
 Blue Rhythm (1931)
 The Moose Hunt (1931)
 Mickey Steps Out (1931)
 Fishin' Around (1931)
 The Barnyard Broadcast (1931)
 The Beach Party (1931)
 Mickey's Orphans (1931)
 The Duck Hunt (1932)
 The Grocery Boy (1932)
 The Mad Dog (1932)
 Mickey's Revue (1932)
 Just Dogs (1932)
 Mickey's Nightmare (1932)
 Trader Mickey (1932)
 The Wayward Canary (1932)
 The Klondike Kid (1932)
 Parade of the Award Nominees (1932)
 Mickey's Good Deed (1932)
 Building a Building (1933)
 The Mad Doctor (1933)
 Mickey's Pal Pluto (1933)
 Mickey's Gala Premier (1933)
 Puppy Love (1933)
 Playful Pluto (1934)
 Mickey Plays Papa (1934)
 Mickey's Kangaroo (1935)
 Mickey's Garden (1935)
 Pluto's Judgement Day (1935)
 On Ice (1935)
 Mickey's Polo Team (1936) (cameo)
 Mickey's Grand Opera (1936)
 Alpine Climbers (1936)
 Donald and Pluto (1936)
 Mickey's Elephant (1936)
 Mother Pluto (1936)
 The Worm Turns (1937)
 Hawaiian Holiday (1937)
 Pluto's Quin-Puplets (1937)
 Mickey's Parrot (1938)
 Society Dog Show (1939)
 Mickey's Surprise Party (1939)
 Beach Picnic (1939)
 The Pointer (1939)
 The Standard Parade (1939)
 Donald's Dog Laundry (1940)
 Put-Put Troubles (1940)
 Bone Trouble (1940)
 Window Cleaners (1940)
 Pluto's Dream House (1940)
 Mr. Mouse Takes a Trip (1940)
 Pantry Pirate (1940)
 Pluto's Playmate (1941)
 A Gentleman's Gentleman (1941)
 Baggage Buster (1941)
 Canine Caddy (1941)
 Lend a Paw (1941)
 Pluto, Junior (1942)
 The Army Mascot (1942)
 The Sleepwalker (1942)
 Out of the Frying Pan Into the Firing Line (1942)
 T-Bone for Two (1942)
 Pluto at the Zoo (1942)
 Pluto and the Armadillo (1943)
 Private Pluto (1943)
 Victory Vehicles (1943)
 Springtime for Pluto (1944)
 First Aiders (1944)
 Dog Watch (1945)
 The Eyes Have It (1945)
 Canine Casanova (1945)
 The Legend of Coyote Rock (1945)
 Canine Patrol (1945)
 Pluto's Kid Brother (1946)
 In Dutch (1946)
 Squatter's Rights (1946)
 The Purloined Pup (1946)
 A Feather in His Collar (1946)
 Pluto's Housewarming (1947)
 Rescue Dog (1947)
 Mickey's Delayed Date (1947)
 Mail Dog (1947)
 Pluto's Blue Note (1947)
 Bone Bandit (1948)
 Mickey Down Under (1948)
 Pluto's Purchase (1948)
 Cat Nap Pluto (1948)
 Mickey and the Seal (1948)
 Pluto's Fledgling (1948)
 Pueblo Pluto (1949)
 Pluto's Surprise Package (1949)
 Pluto's Sweater (1949)
 Bubble Bee (1949)
 Sheep Dog (1949)
 Pluto's Heart Throb (1950)
 Pluto and the Gopher (1950)
 Wonder Dog (1950)
 Primitive Pluto (1950)
 Puss Cafe (1950)
 Pests of the West (1950)
 Food For Feudin''' (1950)
 Camp Dog (1950)
 Cold Storage (1951)
 R'coon Dawg (1951)
 Plutopia (1951)
 Cold Turkey (1951)
 Pluto's Party (1952)
 Pluto's Christmas Tree (1952)
 The Simple Things (1953)

Feature filmsThe Prince and the PauperTotally MinnieWho Framed Roger Rabbit (1988, cameo)Mickey's Once Upon a ChristmasMickey's House of VillainsMickey's Magical Christmas: Snowed in at the House of MouseMickey, Donald, Goofy: The Three MusketeersMickey's Twice Upon a ChristmasVideo games
Pluto appeared as a non-playable character in Mickey Mania (1994).

Pluto also appears in Disney Golf for the PS2. In the event that the player's golf ball goes out of bounds or hits a water hazard, Pluto will come and look for your golf ball.

In the Kingdom Hearts video game series, Pluto is still Mickey's pet and acts as somewhat of a messenger, assisting in his master's plans. For most of Kingdom Hearts II'', Pluto stays by Kairi's side (even when she has been kidnapped), as he has apparently taken a liking to her. Strangely, throughout the series, Pluto appears and disappears at random moments.

Disney parks

In the various Disney theme park resorts around the world, Pluto is a meetable character just like many of his film co-stars. Pluto, however, uncharacteristically walks on two legs in this capacity out of necessity. Adults and children are able to meet, play with, and get autographs and pictures with Pluto and his friends at all Disney parks. Shirts, hats, toys and other various types of merchandise featuring Pluto are available.

Notes

References

External links

Pluto on IMDb

Disney comics characters
Disney core universe characters
Fictional characters from Calisota
Film characters introduced in 1930
Comics characters introduced in 1930
Fictional dogs
Male characters in animation
Male characters in comics
Comedy film characters